Eduard Krüger (9 December 1807 – 8 November 1885) was a German musicologist, composer and philologist.

Life 
Born in Lüneburg, Krüger received his doctorate from the University of Göttingen in 1830 and then continued his studies in Berlin. In 1832 he obtained a position as assistant teacher at the Gymnasium in Emden, where he soon became headmaster, interrupted by a brief appointment at the Alte Gymnasium in Göttingen.

From 1838 he corresponded with Robert Schumann, who appreciated him as a skilful writer and won him as a collaborator for his Neue Zeitschrift für Musik. The correspondence ended abruptly after Krüger criticised Schumann's opera Genoveva in 1851.
In the public dispute between Oswald Lorenz, pseudonym Hans Grobgedakt, on the subject of "organ tone and organ playing" with the main question of "pliability of the organ tone" or of a "need for essential changes in the organ tone"", Krüger took sides with Lorenz, whom he did not know personally but who also wrote articles for the Neue Zeitschrift für Musik.

From 1852 to 1859, Krüger was chief inspector of education for the whole of East Frisia in Aurich.

In 1859, he found employment as an "assistant worker" at the library of the University of Göttingen and eventually received a professorship there in 1862, teaching "Theory and History of Music". His most important student was Hugo Riemann, who received his doctorate from him in 1873. Here he also began in 1876, in collaboration with his colleague  and the pastor , the publication of the journal Siona. Monatschrift für Liturgie und Kirchenmusik.

Work 
 De Musicis graecorum organis circa Pindari tempora Florentibus, Diss. phil. Göttingen 1830
 Grundriß der Metrik antiker und moderner Sprachen, Emden 1838
 Beiträge für Leben und Wissenschaft der Tonkunst, Leipzig: Breitkopf & Härtel 1847 (Numerized)
 System der Tonkunst, Leipzig 1866 (Numerized)
 Musikalische Psychologie nach Anleitung von Gervinus’ Buch Handel und Shakespeare, Leipzig: Breitkopf & Härtel 1868
 Musikalische Briefe aus der neuesten Zeit, Münster 1870 (Numerized)

Further reading 
 Friedrich Chrysander, E. Krüger’s Musikalische Briefe aus der neuesten Zeit, in: Allgemeine Musikalische Zeitung, Jg. 5 (1870), pp. 4f. (Numerized)
 Arthur Prüfer (ed.), Briefwechsel zwischen Carl von Winterfeld and Eduard Krüger, Leipzig: Seemann 1898 (with portrait)
 Uwe Martin, Ein unbekanntes Schumann-Autograph aus dem Nachlaß E. Krügers, in Die Musikforschung, Jg. 12 (1959), 
 Kurt Hoppenrath, E. Krüger (1807–1885). Leben und Wirken eines Musikgelehrten Schumannscher Tradition und Neudeutscher Schule, Diss. phil. Göttingen 1964 (Maschr.)
 Wolfgang Boetticher, Eduard Krüger als Professor der Musikgeschichte, in Musikwissenschaft und Musikpflege an der Georg-August-Universität in Göttingen, published by Martin Staehelin, Göttingen 1987,  (Numerized)
 Martin Tielke, Eduard Krüger als Wegbereiter der Bach- und Händelrenaissance, in Jahrbuch der Gesellschaft für bildende Kunst und vaterländische Altertümer zu Emden, Jg. 72 (1992),  (with portrait)

References

External links 

 

19th-century German musicologists
Academic staff of the University of Göttingen
1807 births
1885 deaths
People from Lüneburg